José Nascimento may refer to:

 José Nascimento (film director) (born 1947), Portuguese film director
 José Nascimento (basketball) (born 1978), Angolan basketball player
 José Nascimento (handballer) (born 1966), Brazilian handball player
 José Ilidio Nascimento, South African human rights lawyer